Pathiye Daiva (Kannada: ಪತಿಯೇ ದೈವ) is a 1964 Indian Kannada film, directed and produced by R. Nagendra Rao. The film stars R. N. Sudarshan, Kalpana, R. Nagendra Rao and Jayanthi in the lead roles. The film's musical score is by Vijaya Bhaskar.

Cast
R. N. Sudarshan
Kalpana
Jayanthi
R. Nagendra Rao
Pandari Bai

References

External links
 

1964 films
1960s Kannada-language films